The 620s decade ran from January 1, 620, to December 31, 629.

Significant people

References

Sources